Events in the year 2012 in Lithuania.

Incumbents 
President: Dalia Grybauskaitė
Prime Minister: Andrius Kubilius (until 13 December), Algirdas Butkevičius (starting 13 December)

Events

January 
January 10 - Anykščiai took the title of a cultural capital of Lithuania.

October 
October 14 – Election to the Seimas and the referendum on the construction of a new nuclear power plant in the Republic of Lithuania.
October 28 – The second poll of the Election to the Seimas.
October 29 – switching to digital television

Art and entertainment 
Lithuania in the Eurovision Song Contest 2012

Sports 
2011–12 Lithuanian Football Cup.
 2012 European Track Championships

Deaths 
19 February – Stasys Stonkus, basketball player (born 1931).
 3 November – Eugenija Pleškytė, actress (born 1938)
 21 November – Algirdas Šocikas, boxer (born 1928)
 26 November – Juilius Veselka, politician, former minister of economy (born 1943).

References